Eric Shauwn Brazas Cray (born November 6, 1988) is a Filipino-American track and field athlete who competes in sprinting and hurdling events. He represented the Philippines at the 2013 World Championships in Athletics, competing in the hurdles. He won gold medals at the Southeast Asian Games in 2013 and 2015. Cray currently holds the Filipino national record for the 400 metres hurdles and 100 metres.

Early life and education
Cray was born in Olongapo, before moving to Sacramento, California to Ellis Jr. and Maria Cray Fish. His mother is a Filipina caregiver working in the U.S., while his father is an American cab driver. He has three sisters. He studied at James Madison High School in San Antonio, Texas in the United States for his secondary education. He has a degree in Education at Bethune–Cookman University and a master's degree in Human Relations at University of Oklahoma.

Career
Cray took up track and field when he was still in high school, competing for the James Madison High School at the district , regional and state championships. He also competed for the Bethune-Cookman University at the NCAA of the United States.

He holds dual American-Filipino dual citizenship but decided to compete for the Philippines in December 2011 upon the request of his mother. The application to compete for the Philippines was approved in 2013 by the IAAF.

He set a new national record and games record in the 400 m hurdles while winning at the 2015 Southeast Asian Games, setting a time of 49.40 seconds. Cray managed to win a bronze at the 60 m event at the 2016 Asian Indoor Athletics Championships. While he only finished seventh in the 400 m hurdles semifinals at the 2016 Summer Olympics with a time of 49.37 seconds, which itself already broke his national and Southeast Asian Games record, he set a better record earlier during the Heat 4 qualifying event with a time of 49.05.

Cray won the gold medal at the 400 meter hurdles event at the 2017 Asian Athletics Championships clocking 49.57 seconds ending his country's 8 year gold drought in the continental tournament.

Cray took the silver in the 60m Dash at the 2017 Asian Indoor Games in Asghartan, Turkmenistan.

At the 2019 Southeast Asian Games, Cray had a poor opening to his campaign after he was disqualified in the 100 meter run after two false starts. However he redeemed himself after winning the gold medal in the 400 meter hurdles and the helped in clinching the gold for his country in the mixed-gender 4x100 relay event.

Personal life
In 2015, Cray reportedly has a fiancé and two children. His sisters are involved in sports; two were track and field athletes and one is a basketball coach, and another is a licensed cosmetologist. He considers American sprinter Michael Johnson as his hero in the sport.

References

External links
 

1988 births
Living people
Sportspeople from Olongapo
Athletes (track and field) at the 2016 Summer Olympics
Filipino male hurdlers
Filipino male sprinters
World Athletics Championships athletes for the Philippines
Filipino people of African-American descent
Bethune–Cookman University alumni
Olympic track and field athletes of the Philippines
Southeast Asian Games medalists in athletics
University of Oklahoma alumni
Southeast Asian Games gold medalists for the Philippines
Southeast Asian Games silver medalists for the Philippines
Southeast Asian Games bronze medalists for the Philippines
Athletes (track and field) at the 2014 Asian Games
Athletes (track and field) at the 2018 Asian Games
Competitors at the 2017 Southeast Asian Games
Asian Games competitors for the Philippines
Competitors at the 2013 Southeast Asian Games
Competitors at the 2015 Southeast Asian Games
Competitors at the 2019 Southeast Asian Games
Competitors at the 2021 Southeast Asian Games